William G. Hemmer (born November 14, 1964) is an American journalist, currently the co-anchor of America's Newsroom on the Fox News Channel, based in New York City.

Early life and education
Hemmer was born in Cincinnati, Ohio on November 14, 1964, the son of William "Bill" Ronald Hemmer, a retired mattress manufacturing-company executive, and Georganne Mary (née Knittle) Hemmer, a homemaker. He is the middle child and second son of the Hemmers' five children.

Hemmer attended Our Lady of Victory Catholic parochial school before graduating from Elder High School in Cincinnati in 1983.

During his senior year, Hemmer and a friend started a radio program, playing fifteen minutes of music before classes began. He credits this time as beginning of his interest for broadcasting.

Hemmer holds a Bachelor of Arts degree in broadcast journalism from Miami University in Oxford, Ohio. While at Miami University, he joined Delta Tau Delta fraternity and studied in Europe at the Miami University Dolibois European Center, which was then located in Luxembourg City, Luxembourg.

Career

Early career
He started in sports production at WLWT-TV in the mid-1980s where he realized his passion for live television. During his senior year at Miami University, Hemmer was offered a position at WLWT-TV as a sports producer. Soon after, he went to the CBS affiliate WCPO-TV as a sports anchor.

At age 26, Hemmer took a nearly year-long hiatus from WCPO-TV to backpack around the world.

Throughout the journey, Hemmer wrote dispatches and submitted tapes and photos for both The Cincinnati Post, a now defunct local newspaper, and CBS's local affiliate that were assembled into several pieces collectively known as "Bill's Excellent Adventure."

The program won him two regional Emmys, Best Entertainment Program and Best Host.

CNN
Hemmer worked at CNN from 1995 to 2005, hosting a number of programs, including American Morning (originally with Paula Zahn, and later with Soledad O'Brien), CNN Tonight, CNN Early Edition, CNN Morning News, and CNN Live Today with co-anchor Daryn Kagan.

In May 2001, Hemmer played an instrumental role in the network's coverage of the Timothy McVeigh execution, reporting from Terre Haute, Indiana, where McVeigh was put to death for his part in the Oklahoma City bombing.

He reported from World Trade Center site in New York City for a month in the aftermath of the attacks of September 11, 2001 and from Khandahar, Afghanistan during the buildup of American forces in the early days of The War on Terror.

In the summer of 2002, Hemmer reported live from Somerset, Pennsylvania, on the mining accident that trapped nine workers for 77 hours when a wall separating their tunnel from an abandoned, flooded mine gave way, sending millions of gallons of water into their work area.

In 2003, Hemmer traveled to Kuwait to report on escalating tensions in Iraq and remained on-site to cover Operation Iraqi Freedom when the war began.

He also spent more than a month covering the crisis in Kosovo, where he reported on the aerial bombing missions from Aviano Air Base in Italy, the refugee crisis from Skopje, Macedonia, and on the latest NATO developments from Brussels.

Fox News
Hemmer joined Fox News in August 2005.  In 2020, he hosted a weekday afternoon newscast Bill Hemmer Reports and served as Chief Anchor for breaking news and other live major events.

Prior to that, he was the founding morning co-anchor of America's Newsroom. He participated in the network's coverage of Hurricane Katrina and Hurricane Rita.
During the war between Israel and Hezbollah in Lebanon during the summer of 2006, Hemmer reported from the front-lines in the town of Metula in Northern Israel.

Throughout the 2008, 2012 and 2016 election seasons, Hemmer covered the political party conventions from their respective cities—including the Iowa Caucus and New Hampshire Primary. His “BillBoard” on Election Nights is designed to bring data to viewers, capturing the vote in real time from precincts across the country.
Hemmer was the network's lead reporter and anchor from the Sandy Hook Elementary School shooting in Newtown, Connecticut, as well as the site of the Boston Marathon bombing in April 2013.
In July 2018, Hemmer traveled to Helsinki, Finland, to report on President Trump's summit with Russian President Vladimir Putin.
In 2019, Hemmer covered February's nuclear summit between President Trump and Chairman Kim Jong-un from Hanoi, Vietnam, concluding that assignment at the DMZ in South Korea.
He also had the first interview with then-Attorney General William Barr when he traveled to El Salvador after the release of Special Counsel Robert Mueller's report on the Russia Investigation in May.

In 2021, Fox News announced a new weekday programming lineup, moving Hemmer back to America's Newsroom with co-anchor Dana Perino.

Following the departure of long-time anchor, Chris Wallace, in January 2022, Bill Hemmer has also been regularly standing in as the host for Fox News Sunday, its flagship weekend interview program.

Personal life
Hemmer is Roman Catholic.

Bill Hemmer started dating model Dara Tomanovich in 2005. They separated in 2013.

He has returned to Cincinnati each year to host the George Knittle Memorial Bayley Place Golf Classic named in honor of his grandfather, George Francis Knittle, which benefits Bayley Senior Living. Mr. Knittle died at the age of 100 on August 26, 2003.

In 2008, Hemmer also was the honorary chair of the Ohio River Valley chapter for the arthritis walk.

He is a supporter of Iraq and Afghanistan Veterans of America.

In April 2013, Hemmer spent a week at the Vatican moderating the Second Annual Adult Stem Cell Research Conference and in May of the same year served as the keynote speaker at Miami University, Oxford's Farmer School of Business' commencement.

Hemmer, along with two fellow Miami University graduates, established the MUDEC scholarship in honor of the long-time service of Dr. Emile Haag to the Miami University Dolibois European Center and awarded to a student seeking financial assistance to attend school in Luxembourg.

In 2013, Hemmer was the recipient of the Elder High School Professional Distinction award.

See also

 List of CNN anchors
 List of The Daily Show guests
 List of Delta Tau Delta members
 List of Miami University people
 New Yorkers in journalism

References

External links
 
 
 

1964 births
Living people
American Roman Catholics
American television news anchors
American television reporters and correspondents
CNN people
Elder High School alumni
Emmy Award winners
Fox News people
Miami University alumni
Television personalities from Cincinnati
21st-century American journalists